The 1997 French Figure Skating Championships took place between December 20th and 21st, 1996 in Amiens for singles and pairs and in Bordeaux for ice dance. Skaters competed in the disciplines of men's singles, women's singles, pair skating, and ice dancing on the senior level. The event was used to help determine the French team to the 1997 World Championships and the 1997 European Championships.

Results

Men

Ladies

Pairs

Ice dance

External links
 French article

1996 in figure skating
French Figure Skating Championships, 1997
French Figure Skating Championships
1997 in French sport